Wulguru is an outer southern suburb of Townsville in the City of Townsville, Queensland, Australia.

Geography
The suburb is bounded to the west by the Lavarack Barracks to the west, University Road (Bruce Highway) to the north, the Cluden Racecourse to the north-west, and by the North Coast railway line to the east. 

There is a water tank at the high point of the suburb which offers views across Townsville. It is accessible by a walking track, off Diamantina Road.

History
The name Wulguru comes from Wulgurukaba, the language/group name of the Aboriginal people of the Cleveland Bay area.

The Wulguru railway station on the North Coast railway line has been abandoned.

Wulguru State School opened on 30 January 1962.

Heritage listings 
Wulguru has a number of heritage-listed sites, including:

 Off Stuart Drive (formerly in Stuart): former Operations and Signals Bunker

Education 
Wulguru State School is a government primary (Prep-6) school for boys and girls at Edison Street. In 2018, the school had an enrolment of 302 students with 27 teachers (24 full-time equivalent) and 18 non-teaching staff (12 full-time equivalent). It includes a special education program.

There are no secondary schools in Wulguru. The nearest government secondary school is William Ross State High School in neighbouring Annandale to the north-west; it is adjacent to the Southern Cross Catholic College.

Amenities 
The Edison Street Plaza is a small neighbourhood centre in Wulguru that lost several of its stores in 2017–2018, including Edison Street Seafood, video hire, Chinese take-away, St Vincent De Paul op shop, a butcher, and a hairdressing salon. A mini-mart store remained, and the seafood/fish and chips shop and the Chinese takeaway were reopened early in 2019 by the mini-mart operator. Next to the school is a park and several soccer fields as well as a scout hall.

There are a number of parks in the area:

 Edison Street Park
 Walguru Park

 Warrego Street Park

 Wulguru Park

World War 2 bunker

At the corner of Diamantina Street and Stuart Drive is a large block of land at the base of Mount Stuart. During World War II, this was the site of No. 3 Fighter Sector RAAF including the Operations and Signals Bunker. Three Fighter Sector headquarters comprised 32 rooms in the large rectangular concrete building with Caneite partitions forming various passageways. The mezzanine floor has long since disappeared.

The bunker structure is listed in the Queensland Heritage Register and encompasses the boundary of Diamantina Street, Stuart Drive and Hill Street.

References

External links 

 
 

Suburbs of Townsville
Queensland in World War II